Ernest John Bailey (17 June 1921 – 31 December 1986) was an English footballer who played as a left back. He made over 340 Football League appearances in the years after the Second World War.

Career
Jack Bailey played locally for BAC, Bristol Aeroplane Company, in Bristol. Bob Hewison signed Bailey in December 1944 from BAC for Bristol City.

Honours
with Bristol City
Football League Third Division South winner: 1954–55

References

1921 births
1986 deaths
English footballers
Association football fullbacks
English Football League players
Southern Football League players
Trowbridge Town F.C. players
Bristol City F.C. players
Footballers from Bristol